The 2006–2007 UCI Track Cycling World Cup Classics is a multi race tournament over a season of track cycling. The season began on 17 November 2006 and completed on 25 February 2007. The World Cup is organised by the UCI.

Calendar

Men

Women

Men's overall results

1 km time trial

individual pursuit

keirin

madison

points race

scratch

sprint

team pursuit

team sprint

Women's overall results

500m time trial

individual pursuit

keirin

points race

scratch

sprint

team sprint

References
 UCI Track Calendar

See also

2007 in track cycling

World Cup Classics
World Cup Classics
UCI Track Cycling World Cup